Jesús Ochoa (born December 24, 1959) is a Mexican actor.

Life and career 
Ochoa was born in Ures, Sonora, Mexico, the son of Manuel Ochoa Martínez and María Cruz Domínguez de Ochoa. At fourteen, he moved to Hermosillo to continue his studies at Normal del Estado.

In 1974, he began his artistic career when he appeared in several plays in Hermosillo. In 1979, he moved to Mexico City to study at the Instituto de Arte Escénico until 1984, in which he began to perform university theater with José Ramón Enriquez in Ciudad sin sueños. In 1985, he returned to Hermosillo and acted in the popular play La Tuba de Goyo Trejo, also participated in several commercials and television shows. He stayed in the city until 1991, when he returned to Mexico City starting with the play El Jefe Maximo, for which he was nominated as Revelation of the year by the Critics and Chronists Theater Union. During the next few years, Ochoa continued to perform in many plays, films, telenovelas, and TV shows. In April 1998, he married María Eugenia Leñero and they currently live in Mexico City.

Filmography

Film

Television 

 2020
Narcos, Mexico 
Juan Nepomuceno Guerra
Seasons 2 - 3

Other work
 Appears in the music video for 50 Cent's rap song "Just a Lil Bit" in which he plays a gangster in a yacht with a girl, who drugs and leaves him at his mercy
 He appears as a butcher in the music video for the Morcheeba single, "Be Yourself"

Awards and nominations

References

External links

1959 births
Living people
Mexican male film actors
People from Hermosillo
People from Ures Municipality